Thayilpatty is a Panchayat town in Virudhunagar District in the State of Tamil Nadu in India.

Demographics

 India census, Thayilpatti had a population of 10000 & above. Males constitute 49% of the population and females 51%. Thayilpatti has an average literacy rate of 62%, higher than the national average of 59.5%: male literacy is 72%, and female literacy is 52%. In Thayilpatti, 12% of the population is under 6 years of age.

Economy
The Thayilpatti Village is near Sivakasi, a prominent place of manufacturing for matches, printing and firecrackers. It is one of the main places for exporting firecrackers.

Adjacent communities

Reference 

Cities and towns in Virudhunagar district